Below is a list of destinations Northwest Airlines flew to at the time of its merger with Delta Air Lines.

List

See also
List of Delta Connection destinations

References

Northwest Airlines
Destinations
Destinations